Oliver Deveta Hamlin Jr. (November 30, 1892 – December 28, 1973) was a United States circuit judge of the United States Court of Appeals for the Ninth Circuit and previously was a United States district judge of the United States District Court for the Northern District of California.

Education and career

Born in Oakland, California, Hamlin received a Bachelor of Laws from the University of California, Berkeley in 1914. He was a deputy district attorney of Alameda County, California from 1915 to 1920, and was in private practice in Oakland from 1920 to 1947. He was a Judge of the Alameda County Superior Court from 1947 to 1953.

Federal judicial service

Hamlin was nominated by President Dwight D. Eisenhower on July 23, 1953, to a seat on the United States District Court for the Northern District of California vacated by Judge Monroe Mark Friedman. He was confirmed by the United States Senate on August 1, 1953, and received his commission on August 3, 1953. His service terminated on April 15, 1958, due to his elevation to the Ninth Circuit.

Hamlin was nominated by President Eisenhower on March 6, 1958, to a seat on the United States Court of Appeals for the Ninth Circuit vacated by Judge William Denman. He was confirmed by the Senate on March 25, 1958, and received commission the next day. He assumed senior status on September 5, 1963. His service terminated on December 28, 1973, due to his death.

References

Sources
 

1892 births
1973 deaths
California state court judges
Judges of the United States District Court for the Northern District of California
United States district court judges appointed by Dwight D. Eisenhower
Judges of the United States Court of Appeals for the Ninth Circuit
United States court of appeals judges appointed by Dwight D. Eisenhower
20th-century American judges